Tropical Storm Alberto produced extensive flooding over portions of Alabama, Georgia, and Florida in July 1994. The first tropical cyclone and named storm of the annual hurricane season, Alberto developed from a tropical wave over the northwestern Caribbean Sea on June 30. Initially a tropical depression, the system moved westward, before curving northwestward on July 1 and entering the Gulf of Mexico. Early on the following day, the depression intensified into Tropical Storm Alberto. Alberto strengthened steadily over the Gulf of Mexico, and by midday on July 3, it peaked as a strong tropical storm with maximum sustained winds of 65 mph (100 km/h). A few hours later, the cyclone made landfall near Destin, Florida, at the same intensity. The system quickly weakened to a tropical depression early on July 4. Thereafter, a high pressure system caused Alberto to drift over west-central Georgia and central Alabama, until the storm dissipated over Alabama on July 7.

Striking the Florida Panhandle as a strong tropical storm, the cyclone caused some erosion and wind damage. Additionally, freshwater flooding forced about 3,000 people to flee their homes. Damage in Florida totaled about $80 million. The storm generated heavy precipitation over much of southeastern Alabama. Floodwaters entered hundreds of homes each in Coffee, Dale, Geneva, Henry, and Houston counties. Georgia experienced the worst effects from the storm. Throughout Alabama, Georgia, and Florida, approximately 18,000 businesses and homes suffered damage or destruction. Alberto was responsible for $1.03 billion in damages (1994 USD) and 32 deaths.

Meteorological history

Radiosonde data from Dakar, Senegal, indicated that a tropical wave emerged into the Atlantic from the west coast of Africa on June 18. The wave moved westward for several days, with an associated area of low clouds. Little deep convection developed until June 26, when the wave was situated in just north of Puerto Rico and the Virgin Islands. However, strong wind shear diminished a significant amount of convection while the system crossed the Bahamas on June 28. After crossing Cuba and emerging into the Caribbean Sea by the following day, deep convection quickly redeveloped and became more concentrated as the wave encountered only light vertical wind shear. A reconnaissance aircraft flight into the system on June 30 detected a well-defined circulation. As a result, Tropical Depression One developed just west of Isla de la Juventud at 06:00 UTC. However, a low aloft centered over the south-central Gulf of Mexico and a mid-latitude short-wave trough moving eastward across the northern gulf caused the depression to curve northwestward on July 1.

Early on July 2, a reconnaissance aircraft flight into the cyclone indicated that it had intensified into a tropical storm, which was assigned the name Alberto. Although the system previously had a rather poor appearance on satellite imagery, the center of circulation became more embedded within the deep convection. About three hours later, the cyclone made landfall near Destin, Florida, at the same intensity. As the storm moved inland, satellite imagery detected hints of a developing eye feature. However, Alberto rapidly weakened, falling to tropical depression intensity by 00:00 UTC on July 4. After bypassing the short-wave trough, the cyclone's forward progress became blocked by a building high pressure area. As a result, Alberto began drifting over Georgia, executing a small cyclonic loop before entering Alabama. Although very weak, the depression remained a tropical cyclone until its circulation dissipated over Alabama late on July 7.

Preparations
On June 30, on the day of Alberto's formation, a tropical storm warning was issued from Puerto Juárez to Mérida, Mexico; the warning was discontinued on July 1. In the United States, a tropical storm watch was posted on July 2 for locations between Sabine Pass, Texas and Pensacola, Florida. The watch was subsequently upgraded to a tropical storm warning from Gulfport, Mississippi to Cedar Key, Florida; it was soon altered to a hurricane warning. Later on July 3, the hurricane warning was discontinued and replaced with a tropical storm warning, which was lifted at 2100 UTC.

On the Florida Panhandle, residents boarded up windows in anticipation of what was to be a "fury". At gasoline stations, unusually long lines formed, and local stores did increased business in selling emergency supplies. Thousands of tourists along the coast left the region; a local deputy was quoted as estimating that 10,000 people checked out of their hotels early. On Okaloosa Island and Holiday Isle, ground-floor house and businesses were forced to evacuate. Civil-defense authorities evacuated residents from low-lying locations. Then-Governor of Florida, Lawton Chiles, declared a State of emergency for parts of the state, and advised residents along the coast to monitor updates regarding the storm. Over 3,000 people sought refuge in Red Cross shelters along the coast of Florida, westward into parts of Alabama.

Impact

Florida

At St. George Island, wind gusts reached . Beach erosion and tidal flooding occurred along the coast. Other precipitation accumulations include  at Caryville.

Along the coast, damage was limited to sea walls, piers and boats, and roof damage to some beachfront motels. As the storm progressed inland, it brought down signs, billboards, trees and powerlines, and triggered moderate flooding; about 18,500 customers lost electric power. As a weakened tropical depression, the remnants of Alberto dropped extensive rainfall throughout the region. As heavy rain fell to the north, tremendous volumes of water moved down major river systems into the Florida Panhandle. As a result, there was extensive river flooding that exceeded 100-year events in some locations, particularly along the Apalachicola and Chipola Rivers. The Apalachicola remained above flood stage until August, although in localized areas, flooding persisted until September due to Tropical Storm Beryl. A total of 300,000 chickens and 125 cattle and hogs were lost within the state, and offshore, 90% of the oysters in Apalachicola Bay were lost. The flooding was severe, inflicting $40 million (1994 USD) in damage to infrastructure, $14 million in insured damage, and $25 million in agricultural losses.

Georgia

In Georgia, rainfall from the tropical cyclone peaked at 27.85 in (707 mm) near Americus. Due to a previously stalled cold front, which subsequently caused Alberto to remain stationary, the ground was already saturated with rainfall. Virtually all of the precipitation became instant runoff into streams and rivers. Peak discharges along the Flint and Ocmulgee rivers exceeded 100-year flood levels.  At least 100 dams and recreational watersheds suffered severe damage or were destroyed. Many roads were inundated, forcing the closure of 175 roads and 1,000 bridges. Damage to highway infrastructure exceeded $130 million.

Approximately  of croplands were submerged, causing about $100 million in damage to agriculture. Fifteen of the United States Geological Survey's (USGS) gaging stations were severely damaged or demolished, forcing data to be collected manually and reported by cellphone. Due to flooded water systems, approximately 500,000 people were temporarily left without drinking water. There were 31 deaths in the state, most of which from cars being swept onto flooded roads or into swollen creeks. With $750 million in damage, Alberto was considered the costliest tropical cyclone in Georgia, until Hurricane Michael in 2018. The flooding was considered the worst in the history of the state.

Southwest Georgia
Along the state line with Florida, five counties in southwestern Georgia reported  of precipitation. In Bainbridge, the rising Flint River caused 300 residents to evacuate. Although the river crested about  lower than initially predicted, flooding moderately or severely damaged approximately 300 homes in Bainbridge, as well as more than a dozen businesses. A local fertilizer plant was also threatened by the swollen Flint River. In the five counties of Brooks, Colquitt, Cook, Thomas, and Worth, the Little and Ochlockonee rivers overflowed their banks, flooding adjacent areas. In Early and Miller counties,  of rain fell between July 3 and July 7, while an additional  of precipitation was observed from July 10 to July 14. Many low-lying areas were flooded. Seven families were evacuated from their homes in Safford due to flooding. Further north, the Flint River also overflow its banks in Baker and Mitchell counties. Extensive flooding occurred in Newton, with more than $100,000 in property damage. Widespread inundation of crops were reported in both counties.

In Dougherty County, the Flint River exceeded its banks, forcing over 20,000 residents to evacuate. Five deaths were reported in the county, with four people drowning in the river and another from a woman being trapped in her home for several days. The City of Albany was cut in half by the flooding, and hundreds of caskets were disinterred and floated away, sometimes disintegrating into the water. Several locations along State Route 37 flooded in Fort Gaines, a city in Clay County.To the north in Randolph County, Cuthbert recorded  of rainfall during a 5-day period. Many streets in the city were flooded, including two portions of U.S. Route 82 and a part of State Route 266. In Terrell County, the sheriff's department reported that many roads were inundated due to swollen creeks and streams. A number of homes and businesses were suffered extensive impact, with up to several million dollars in many. A woman died in Dawson after her car was swept off the road into Chickasawhatchee River.

Numerous county roads were flooded in Lee County due to swollen streams and creeks. Over 600 people were evacuated from their homes county-wide after rising waters began to flood residential areas. In Webster County, many roads were inundated due to the flooding of streams and creeks. About  of precipitation fell in Dodge, Pulaski, Wilcox counties, inundating croplands along the Ocmulgee River. Extensive flooding was reported in much of Dooly County. Several bridges washed out and many roads were closed, including State Route 27 near Drayton. Some residential areas were flooded, resulting in evacuations. In Crisp County, a portion of Interstate 75 was closed due to flooding. A subdivision was evacuated, as well as areas around Lake Blackshear.

In Americus, flood waters threatened  of peanuts and other crops such as cotton and corn, while numerous streets, businesses, and homes were inundated. Nine people died after cars washed off of inundated roads. Two other fatalities occurred after flood waters destroyed a home on Lake Jackson and another after a mobile home was swept away. In Plains,  of rainfall was observed. Several homes and businesses were inundated. A tractor trailer on U.S. Route 280 washed away, killing the three male occupants of the vehicle. Additionally, flood waters approached the home of former President of the United States Jimmy Carter, but no damage occurred. Standing water also covered numerous roads in Leslie. On Lake Corinth, a 17‑year‑old boy attempted to fix a downed telephone line, but died after his boat capsized.

Central Georgia
For a time, the city of Macon was completely cut off by flood waters severing all roads in and out of the city. Most of the city lost all water service during the height of flood when two major treatment plants were flooded. It took almost three weeks before service was restored. The city of Montezuma was the hardest hit of all when the flood levee was topped by the nearby Flint River. The entire downtown area was inundated with up to 18 feet of water. Cleanup would take months to complete.

In Columbus,  of precipitation was observed in 24 hours, while  of rain fell throughout a 4-day period. Police reported that numerous streets were flooded, including a cave-in caused by runoff. Three homes in West Point were evacuated.

Several people in Taylor County reported seeing a funnel cloud. Thunderstorm winds damaged some buildings and mobile homes. One woman suffered minor injuries.

North Georgia and Atlanta metropolitan area
Flooding also occurred in portions of the Atlanta metropolitan area. In Heard County, the city of Franklin recorded  of precipitation. To the east in Coweta County,  of rain fell. Two mobile home parks were flooded. Water also inundated Interstate 85 at exit 11. The storm also dropped heavy precipitation in Meriwether County, including  of rain in less than an hour. The resultant flash flood forced the evacuation of two homes and the closure of seven roads, while one bridge was washed out. A thunderstorm in Pike County on July 4 generated wind gusts exceeding , downing a number of trees and power lines and damaging homes and historical buildings in Zebulon. A thunderstorm on the following day produced downburst winds, which damaged a few office buildings, ripped off portions of a church roof, and downed more trees in the city. In Spalding County,  of precipitation was observed at Griffin. Many homes and businesses were flooded and several earthen dams failed. A woman died when her cars ran into a washed out road; two others were injured in the same location.

About  of rain fell in Butts County. Several roads were inundated by flood waters and a number of culverts and drainage systems that collapsed due to excessive water; a total of 20 roads were closed. Seventy to eighty families in the county were evacuated. In Henry County, flooding resulted in the closure of about forty roads – including Interstate 75 from Jodeco Road to State Route 20 – with only five or six reopened by a week after the storm began impacting the area. Damage to roads and bridges in the county totaled approximately $500,000. Additionally, the water authority suffered about $1.2 million in damage. Two deaths occurred in Henry County, both from separate drowning incidents in the Towaliga River.

In Clayton County, rising waterways forced the evacuation of nearly 500 people in the Jonesboro area, including about 200 people at an apartment complex along Sullivan Creek, a tributary of the Flint River. Numerous other dwellings in the county were destroyed. Flooding resulted in the closure of seven roads and the collapse of several bridges. Damage to roads and bridges in the county reached approximately $250,000. The water plant suffered about $900,000 in damage, causing it to be shut down. Rainfall totals between  flooded numerous culverts, houses, and roads in Rockdale County. Additionally, a 16‑year‑old girl drowned after attempting to rescue a dog. At the Hartsfield–Jackson Atlanta International Airport in Atlanta,  of rain was recorded, forcing many to evacuate flooded apartments in nearby College Park. Another person died in a DeKalb County due to a car accident caused by slick roads.

Aftermath
Because of the severe flooding in the state of Georgia, then-governor Zell Miller declared 30 counties in a state of emergency, which included the following counties in central Georgia: Bibb, Butts, Crawford, Dooly, Houston, Jones, Lamar, Macon, Monroe, Peach, Sumter, Taylor, Twiggs, and Upson.

Despite the extensive damage and loss of life caused by the storm, the name Alberto was not retired and was used again in the 2000 season.

See also

Other storms of the same name
List of wettest tropical cyclones in the United States
List of floods
List of Florida hurricanes (1975-1999)
Timeline of the 1994 Atlantic hurricane season

References

External links

NHC Alberto report
NWS Service Assessment

Alberto
Alberto (1994)
Alberto (1994)
Alberto (1994)
Alperto
History of Atlanta
1994 natural disasters in the United States